Juan Espantaleón (1885–1966) was a Spanish film actor.

Selected filmography
 Currito of the Cross (1926)
 Nobleza baturra (1935)
 Huella de luz (1943)
 Eloisa Is Under an Almond Tree (1943)
 The Nail (1944)
 The Phantom and Dona Juanita (1945)
 White Mission (1946)
The Prodigal Woman (1946)
 The Holy Queen (1947)
 The Faith (1947)
 The Princess of the Ursines (1947)
 Mare Nostrum (1948)
 Just Any Woman (1949)
 Currito of the Cross (1949)
 Night Arrival (1949)
 Agustina of Aragon (1950)
 Apollo Theatre (1950)
 Saturday Night (1950)
 The Great Galeoto (1951)
 Our Lady of Fatima (1951)

References

Bibliography 
 Luis Mariano González. Fascismo, kitsch y cine histórico español, 1939-1953. Univ de Castilla La Mancha, 2009.

External links 
 

1885 births
1966 deaths
Spanish male film actors
Spanish male silent film actors
People from Seville